Miami Ad School is a for-profit creative portfolio school focused on Art Direction, Copywriting, Graphic Design, Photography, Strategic Planning and Social Media with additional locations in Atlanta, New York and San Francisco. 
The school was founded by Ron and Pippa Seichrist in 1993 in Miami Beach, Florida. The school is currently headquartered in (Miami, Florida) with locations in four U.S. cities, and affiliate schools in eight other countries.

Foundation and programs
Miami Ad School was founded in 1993 by Ron Seichrist, a former creative director, and his wife, Pippa, also a former creative director. Miami Ad School's four US locations are accredited by the Council on Occupational Education, having initially been a candidate for accreditation in 1994, and received accreditation in 1995. It has since been described as among "the most prestigious institutions of higher education" in the field of design.

Among its programs, the school offers three-month Boot Camps for Strategic Planning and Social Media. According to industry journal Adweek: "The facility operates in many ways like a traditional agency, in that students direct spots, write advertising copy, and learn to manage budgets." In May 2012, the school also launched its professional training workshops to provide instruction on recent trends for advertising industry professionals. The program was launched in Brooklyn, New York.

Notable campaigns

In 2013, Miami Ad School students in the school's San Francisco campus created an ad campaign for The Trevor Project, highlighting the danger of the bullying of LGBT youth leading to suicide. Also in 2013, Miami Ad School students in New York developed "a fictional promotion for the New York Public Library that would leverage public transportation," allowing commuters to temporarily download excerpts from best-selling books. The proposal drew some interest from local libraries, and a similar promotion was eventually launched in train stations in Philadelphia. In a similar campaign in 2014, "Miami Ad School students teamed up with Pandora to create the "Underground Stations" campaign highlighting subway musicians."

In 2011, students developed a marketing campaign for a Russian vodka brand involving a virtual "Russian roulette," where four participants would provide their Facebook login details, with the "loser" having his Facebook account permanently deleted, and the "winners" being entered in a sweepstakes to win a trip to Russia.

In 2007, the school advertised its own programs by creating a magazine ad containing perforated trading cards representing famous advertising industry people, and in 2010 it did so by creating its own bottled water brand, named "Smudge Slobber" after the founder's dog.

Locations

United States
Atlanta, Georgia
Miami, Florida
New York City, New York
San Francisco, California

International
Berlin, Germany
Buenos Aires, Argentina
Madrid, Spain
Mexico City, Mexico
Mumbai, India
Punta Cana, Dominican Republic
Rio de Janeiro, Brazil
Sao Paulo, Brazil
Sydney, Australia
Toronto, Ontario, Canada
Colombo, Sri Lanka

References

External links
Official website

Educational institutions established in 1993
Private universities and colleges in Florida
Universities and colleges accredited by the Council on Occupational Education
Universities and colleges in Miami-Dade County, Florida
Education in Miami
Graphic design schools in the United States
1993 establishments in Florida